= Griggs Corners, Ohio =

Unincorporated community in Ohio, U.S.

Coordinates: 41°47′21″N 80°42′47″W

Griggs Corners is an unincorporated community in Ashtabula County, in the U.S. state of Ohio.

== History ==
A post office was established at Griggs Corners in 1867, and remained in operation until 1903. The community derives its name from Solomon Griggs, a local resident.
